Durning Library is a public lending library in Kennington, London. It is part of Lambeth Libraries in the London Borough of Lambeth and is in purpose-built Grade II listed building at 167 Kennington  Lane, Kennington, London SE11.

The Durning Library was built in 1889, designed by Sidney R. J. Smith the architect of  Tate Britain, in the Gothic Revival style. It was a gift to the people of Kennington from Jemina Durning Smith.

References

External links
 

Grade II listed buildings in the London Borough of Lambeth
Kennington
Grade II listed library buildings
Libraries in the London Borough of Lambeth